Fahrudin Gjurgjevikj (born 17 February 1992) is a Macedonian footballer  who plays for Albanian club KF Vllaznia Shkodër. His surname can also be transliterated in Serbian Cyrillic as Ђурђевић, or as Đurđević/Djurdjević in Latin script.

Club career
Born in Skopje, he had previously played in the Makedonija GP and Vardar. He moved to Serbia in the summer 2011 to sign with SuperLiga club FK Spartak Zlatibor Voda. He can play either as forward or any side winger. During the winter break of the 2012–13 season he moved to Bosnian side NK Zvijezda Gradačac. In the summer 2013 he returned to Macedonia and signed with his former club FK Makedonija Gjorče Petrov.

International career
He has been a regular member of the Macedonian U-19 national team. In August 2011 he has been called for the Macedonian U-19 national team to play a friendly match against Cyprus U21 on 6 September. Since 2012 he has also been a member of the Macedonian U-21 team.

References

1992 births
Living people
Footballers from Skopje
Association football forwards
Macedonian footballers
FK Makedonija Gjorče Petrov players
FK Vardar players
FK Spartak Subotica players
NK Zvijezda Gradačac players
FK Varnsdorf players
FC Hradec Králové players
FK Rabotnički players
KF Vllaznia Shkodër players
Macedonian First Football League players
Serbian SuperLiga players
Premier League of Bosnia and Herzegovina players
Czech National Football League players
Macedonian expatriate footballers
Expatriate footballers in Serbia
Macedonian expatriate sportspeople in Serbia
Expatriate footballers in Bosnia and Herzegovina
Macedonian expatriate sportspeople in Bosnia and Herzegovina
Expatriate footballers in the Czech Republic
Macedonian expatriate sportspeople in the Czech Republic
Expatriate footballers in Albania
Macedonian expatriate sportspeople in Albania